Trevor Wesley Pryce II (born August 3, 1975) is a former American football defensive lineman and author who played fourteen seasons in the National Football League (NFL).  Pryce played college football for the University of Michigan before transferring to Clemson University.  He was selected by the Denver Broncos in the first round of the 1997 NFL Draft.

Early years
Born in Brooklyn, New York, Pryce attended Lake Howell High School in Winter Park, Florida, and was a standout in football and as a hurdler in track.

College career
Trevor Pryce played defensive end for Clemson University during the 1996 season. He was a transfer from the University of Michigan.  He decided to forgo his senior season to enter the NFL Draft.

Professional career

Denver Broncos
Pryce was selected by the Denver Broncos in the first round (28th overall) in the 1997 NFL Draft. In his rookie season he played in eight games and recorded 24 tackles and two sacks. He made his NFL debut on November 2 versus the Seattle Seahawks. In his second year with the Broncos, he started 15 out of the 16 games and made 43 tackles and a then career high 8.5 sacks. He was also a member of the Broncos' back-to-back championship teams, winning Super Bowl XXXII and Super Bowl XXXIII team. In the 1999 season he started in 15 games and recorded 46 tackles and a career-high 13 sacks. He also earned his first trip to the Pro Bowl. The following season, 2000, he started all 16 regular season games and finished the season with 46 tackles and 12 sacks. He was also voted to his second consecutive Pro Bowl. In 2001, he was voted to his third consecutive Pro Bowl after finishing the season with 41 tackles and seven sacks. The 2002 season saw Pryce voted to the Pro Bowl for the fourth year in a row after finishing the campaign with 46 tackles and nine sacks. In 2003, he started in all 16 games including his 100th career game and recorded 36 tackles and 8.5 sacks. The 2004 season was a frustrating one for Pryce as he only played in two games after surgery on a herniated disc in his lower back. In his last year with the Broncos, Pryce started 16 times and recorded 33 tackles and four sacks.

In 2009, although no longer a member of the franchise, Pryce was named to the Broncos' 50th Anniversary Team; he took out an ad in the Denver Post thanking fans for the honor.

Baltimore Ravens
Pryce was signed by the Baltimore Ravens as a free agent on March 14, 2006. In his first season with the Ravens, he started in all 16 games and finished the season 47 tackles and 13 sacks which equaled his career-high. His play was a huge part of the Ravens' defense ranking No. 1 overall in 2006, and also had a franchise record of 60 regular season team sacks. In 2007, he made 15 tackles and two sacks, missing most of the season due to injury.

In the 2008 season, he made 27 tackles and 4.5 sacks.

In the 2009 season, he finished with 31 tackles, 6.5 sacks, and 1 forced fumble. He was not a full-time starter this year, splitting time with his 2007 replacement, Dwan Edwards.

On September 29, 2010 Pryce was released from the Baltimore Ravens to make room for defensive back Ken Hamlin.

New York Jets
On September 30, 2010, Pryce was signed by the New York Jets.

Retirement
After the 2010 AFC Championship Game, Pryce confirmed he was done playing football. In 2011, he officially retired.

NFL statistics

Key
 GP: games played
 COMB: combined tackles
 TOTAL: total tackles
 AST: assisted tackles
 SACK: sacks
 FF: forced fumbles
 FR: fumble recoveries
 FR YDS: fumble return yards 
 INT: interceptions
 IR YDS: interception return yards
 AVG IR: average interception return
 LNG: longest interception return
 TD: interceptions returned for touchdown
 PD: passes defensed

Personal life
Pryce's sister, Nandi Pryce, is a former soccer player who played for the United States women's national team.

Author
In 2013 Pryce began a second career as a professional writer, publishing the first of his young adult series Kulipari: An Army of Frogs, with co-writer Joel Naftali and illustrator Sanford Greene, from Amulet Books. The series was adapted in 2016 into an original animated series, Kulipari: An Army of Frogs, by Netflix.

In June 2016 it was announced that Pryce was writing a sequel comic, with co-writer Joshua Starnes and illustrator Sonia Liao, set to pick up directly after the novels ended.

References

External links
Ravens Player Bio
New York Jets Bio

1975 births
Living people
American Conference Pro Bowl players
American football defensive ends
American football defensive tackles
American people of Jamaican descent
Baltimore Ravens players
New York Jets players
Clemson Tigers football players
Denver Broncos players
Michigan Wolverines football players
Players of American football from Florida
Sportspeople from Brooklyn
Players of American football from New York City
Sportspeople from Winter Park, Florida